Rosemarkie (from  meaning "promontory of the horse stream") is a village on the south coast of the Black Isle peninsula in Ross-shire  (Ross and Cromarty), northern Scotland.

Geography
Rosemarkie lies a quarter of a mile east of the town of Fortrose. Close to the village the Markie Burn has its mouth in the Moray Firth. The stream runs into the Fairy Glen, a small and steep-sided valley established as a RSPB nature reserve. 

Rosemarkie fronts on a wide, picturesque bay, with views of Fort George and the Moray coastline across the Moray Firth. It has one of the finest beaches on the Moray Firth Coast Line. At the southern end of the beach is Chanonry Point, reputed to be the best location on the United Kingdom mainland from which to see dolphins.

The village is linked to Inverness by broadly hourly bus services, which are provided by Stagecoach Group.

Pictish stones

Rosemarkie is probably best known for its collection of finely carved Pictish stones, which is one of the largest in Scotland at a single site. These 8th-9th-century sculptures, found in and around the town's churchyard, are displayed in the Groam House Museum, a converted 18th-century town-house on the High Street. The house is open in summer and charges a small entrance fee. These carved stones are evidence for a major early monastery at Rosemarkie, founded by, or associated with, Saint Moluag (d. 592) and Boniface, otherwise known as Curetán (fl. early 8th century). The sculptures include cross-slabs, shrine fragments and architectural pieces. One small fragment of a stone from Rosemarkie is in the Museum of Scotland in Edinburgh.

Notable people
 Vince Jack (19332006), footballer

See also
Curetán
Bishop of Ross (Scotland)
Rosemarkie sculpture fragments
Rosemarkie transmitting station

Footnotes

External links
 Rosemarkie

Populated places on the Black Isle
Archaeological sites in Highland (council area)
Parishes in Ross and Cromarty